Placynthium glaciale is a species of saxicolous lichen in the family Placynthiaceae. Found in Alaska, it was described as a new species in 2020 by lichenologists Alan Fryday and Toby Spribille. The type specimen was collected in the Hoonah-Angoon Census Area of Glacier Bay National Park, on the upper end of Muir Inlet. Here the lichen was found growing on an argillite-like boulder as well as exposed cobbles in post-glacial soil. The specific epithet glaciale  alludes to its association with glacial forelands.

References

Peltigerales
Lichen species
Lichens described in 2020
Lichens of Subarctic America
Taxa named by Toby Spribille
Fungi without expected TNC conservation status